The Romanian football champions are the winners of Liga I, Romania's premier annual association football league competition. The title has been contested since 1909 in varying forms of competition. Steaua București has won a record 26 championship titles, thus making it the most prolific team in the Liga I. The second most successful team in the league is Dinamo București with 18 championship titles. The Steaua-Dinamo rivalry, also known as the Eternal Derby, is the biggest one in the Romanian football championship, and between the two teams, they have won the championship 44 times and finished as runners-up another 37 times during the 102 completed seasons.

The third most prolific team was Venus București which won all of its titles during the early editions of the championship, winning eight trophies before its dissolution in 1949. Since the first edition in 1909–10, the league has been won by 23 teams representing 12 cities, with nearly two-thirds of all editions (59 titles) being won by teams from the capital, Bucharest. The 2007–08 champions CFR Cluj were the first team outside Bucharest to win the championship in 16 years.

The first Romanian Football Championship was held between December 1909 and January 1910 and included three teams, two from Bucharest and one from Ploiești. The title was decided using a knock-out format, with Olympia București being the inaugural winners. The knock-out format was used until the 1921–22 season, when a league consisting of seven teams was formed. The regular regional leagues season was followed by a final tournament featuring the first placed teams of each region. The championship was suspended due to the World Wars from 1916 to 1919 and 1941 to 1946. The competition kept the name Divizia A from 1921 until 2006 when it was changed to Liga I following a trademark dispute. Between 1955 and 1992, the winner of the championship qualified into the European Champion Clubs' Cup, which was the predecessor of the current UEFA Champions League. The most successful Romanian team to enter this competition is Steaua București, who won the trophy in the 1985–86 season and played the final in the 1988–89 season. For the first time in history, the crowned champion from the 2007–08 season of Liga I qualified directly into the UEFA Champions League group stage, which continued until the UEFA Champions League 2011–12 season.

The 2015–16 season of the Liga I was the first season to take place since the new playoff/playout system was introduced. Thus in the regular season the 16 teams met twice, a total of 30 matches per team, with the top 6 advancing to the Championship round and the bottom 10 qualifying for the Relegation round. This season was marked by another milestone, the Giurgiu-based team FC Astra was crowned champions for the first time whilst ending FCSB three-year domination.

List

Romanian Football Championship (1909–1921)

Divizia A (1921–2006)

Liga I (2006–present)

Total titles won
Bold indicates clubs currently playing in 2022–23 Liga I. Teams in italics no longer exist. Teams in neither bold or italics are existing past winners of the championship that relegated to Romania's lower leagues.

By city
The following table lists the Romanian champions by cities.

Maps

See also
 Football records in Romania
 Football in Romania
 List of football clubs in Romania by major honors won
 Romanian football league system

Footnotes
A.  Between 1916 and 1919 there was no competition held and no champion declared.
B.  No sources are available for this period.
C.  Between 1941 and 1946 there was no official competition held.
D.  Won 6 of the 26 titles under the name of CCA București.
E.  Won 4 of the 6 titles as ITA Arad and Flamura Roşie Arad.
F.  Won its title under the name of UD Reșița.

References

External links
 
Romanian Football Association 
Romania – List of Champions, RSSSF.com

champions
champions
Romania